Glyphipterix argyrelata is a species of sedge moths in the genus Glyphipterix. It was described by Alfred Jefferis Turner in 1932. It is found in Australia, including Queensland.

References

Moths described in 1932
Glyphipterigidae
Moths of Australia